John Ross Rosenblatt (December 25, 1907– October 29, 1979) was an American civic leader, the mayor of Omaha, Nebraska, from 1954 to 1961. His name remains synonymous with baseball in Omaha, and Rosenblatt Stadium was named after him. Rosenblatt led his hometown with warmth and optimism; one of six children born to Jewish immigrant parents, he started selling newspapers at age seven. He seemed a natural salesman, whether it was pitching papers, the municipal stadium project or the city at large.

Rosenblatt was more than just a baseball fan, he was a top outfielder in amateur and semipro leagues for nearly 20 years. He played many games at Rourke Park near 15th and Vinton, the predecessor to Municipal Stadium. As a semipro player, under the name Johnny Ross, Rosenblatt faced Satchel Paige, the famed Negro league pitcher. “I never saw a pitch travel so fast in all my life,” he said of the experience. He also played in a 1927 exhibition with Babe Ruth and Lou Gehrig.

The mayor won many friends and accolades during his career in sports and politics. He was called “the supreme gentleman” by Archbishop Gerald T. Bergan. Longtime City Clerk Mary Galligan Cornett said he was “absolutely the greatest guy you ever knew.” City Planning Director Alden Aust described him as “one of the best and most successful mayors I have known.” Aust continued his praise, listing Rosenblatt’s attributes as friendly, gentle, optimistic, trusting and self-effacing.

After starring as an athlete at Tech High in Midtown Omaha, Rosenblatt attended the University of Iowa on a baseball scholarship but had to leave college to help support his family. He played basketball briefly at Omaha University. The young Rosenblatt played baseball in sandlot leagues for a few years, then Roberts Dairy came calling for the left-handed outfielder in 1933. The company wanted him for its fast-pitch Omaha League team. He got more than a position on the team, he landed a sales job. Thus began a relationship with Roberts that lasted more than 20 years. Rosenblatt even returned to the dairy after his political career.

In the early 1940s, Rosenblatt and several businessmen were seeking a AAA baseball franchise for Omaha. The idea for building a ballpark received major impetus in 1944 when Omaha was ruled out as a possible site for an American Association franchise because it lacked a suitable stadium. Rourke Park had burned to the ground in 1936.

Rosenblatt and his friend Eddie Jelen were the prime movers behind the stadium push. As chairman of the Municipal Stadium Sports Committee, Rosenblatt approached the city council to request a referendum in April 1945 for a stadium bond issue. By a 3 to 1 margin, voters approved a $480,000 bond issue. A second bond issue of $280,000 was needed in 1948 to complete the infield, install lights and finish parking lots.

Rosenblatt ran for city commissioner in 1948, primarily on platform to complete the stadium project properly. The inaugural event in October 1948 drew some 15,000 fans, who saw major leaguers and Nebraska natives Rex Barney, Richie Ashburn, and Johnny Hoop compete against a collection of sandlot and minor league players.

In his zeal to promote the new stadium, Rosenblatt proposed some outlandish proposals that did not materialize, such as Nebraska vs. Notre Dame and Army vs. Omaha University college football games. He did pull off a Los Angeles Rams–New York Giants exhibition football game that attracted 13,000 fans and generated $9,000 for Children's Hospital. He also arranged for the American Legion's Little World Series, which drew 47,000 fans over several days.

He joined Ed Pettis and Morris Jacobs in persuading the NCAA to relocate championship baseball series to Omaha's new stadium. In 1950 the College World Series settled into Municipal Stadium after two years in Kalamazoo, Michigan, and one in Wichita. In a 1971 B'nai B'rith salute, Rosenblatt said the College World Series has been "an inspiration to the youth of our community."

His original goal for the stadium was fulfilled in 1955, when the St. Louis Cardinals brought a AAA baseball team to Municipal Stadium. Formerly the Columbus Red Birds in Ohio, the Omaha Cardinals occupied the stadium for five seasons, through 1959. Rosenblatt then negotiated with the Los Angeles Dodgers, whose Omaha Dodgers farm team played two years at the stadium (1961 and 1962).

Though he threatened to resign in 1949, Rosenblatt served admirably in public life, first as public property commissioner and then as street commissioner. He was first elected mayor in 1954. In 1957, midway through his seven years tenure, he became the first mayor since James Dahlman directly elected by the people. A change in the city charter called for direct election of the mayor rather than the commissioner-appointed system that had been in place since 1912.

In a 1961 interview, Rosenblatt named diplomacy as perhaps the crucial skill that defined his political career. “My main effort has been aimed toward avoiding fights,” he said. “So much of the work of a city administrator is a matter of public relations or human relations.” Rosenblatt learned to compromise after the defeat of the Omaha Plan, a massive — and expensive — public improvement proposal in 1958. He was able to convince voters to approve bond issues for the most crucial needs, such as sewage treatment plants. The mayor was proud of the 20 percent growth Omaha recorded through annexations. The Interstate highway system was started in Omaha during his term.

In June 1961, just after James Dworak had assumed the mayor's office, Rosenblatt received a lifetime pass to the stadium he built. Three years later the city council voted unanimously to name it Rosenblatt Stadium.

Ironically, as head of the Chamber of Commerce Sports Committee in 1963, Rosenblatt appointed a subcommittee to review the possibility of a downtown stadium.

Parkinson's disease had started to slow Rosenblatt late in his mayoral term. He underwent brain surgery procedures and drug interventions, but the disease persisted. Rosenblatt died at age 71 on October 29, 1979, and was buried at Beth El Cemetery in Ralston.

Rosenblatt was married to the former Freeda Brodkey (1911–1973) for 39 years. His son, Steve, served on the Omaha City Council from 1973 to 1981 and as a Douglas County commissioner from 1981 to 1995, and later relocated to Phoenix, Arizona.

See also
List of mayors of Omaha

References

External links

Mayors of Omaha, Nebraska
Jewish mayors of places in the United States
1907 births
1979 deaths
20th-century American politicians
Burials at Beth El Cemetery (Ralston, Nebraska)
Jewish American people in Nebraska politics
20th-century American Jews